Zarrineh Rud-e Jonubi Rural District is in the Central District of Miandoab County, West Azerbaijan province, Iran. At the National Census of 2006, its population was 11,294 in 2,643 households. There were 11,361 inhabitants in 3,195 households at the following census of 2011. At the most recent census of 2016, the population of the rural district was 11,337 in 3,482 households. The largest of its 19 villages was Sowgoli Tappeh, with 3,169 people.

References 

Miandoab County

Rural Districts of West Azerbaijan Province

Populated places in West Azerbaijan Province

Populated places in Miandoab County